WCHZ-FM (93.1 FM, "Hot 95.5/93.1") is a radio station broadcasting a classic hip hop format. Licensed to Warrenton, Georgia, the station goes by the name "Hot 95.5/93.1" and is owned by Beasley Media Group.

History
The station was assigned the call letters WRFN on August 4, 1997. It launched with a sports talk format, owned by Beard Broadcasting alongside sister AM sports station, WRDW. Beasley Broadcasting purchased both stations in 1999. On October 3, 2003, the station changed its call sign to WGAC-FM, simulcasting news/talk WGAC-AM.

On August 10, 2011, WGAC-FM's news/talk format (simulcast of WGAC 580) moved to 95.1 FM, licensed to Harlem, Georgia, swapping frequencies with rock-formatted WCHZ; the stations also swapped call signs five days later. The move also shifted WCHZ to the AM dial as a simulcast on 1480 AM, displacing WGUS-AM, although WGUS continued to broadcast on its 102.7 FM signal. Due to the new frequency's poor coverage of the Augusta market with 93.1 and inadequate sound quality on the AM dial, Beasley Broadcasting began broadcasting 95 Rock on a broadcast translator with 250 watts at 95.5 FM to better cover the city of Augusta and surrounding towns on January 16, 2012. In 2014, the station switched to simulcasting WGUS-FM, as 93.1 and 102.7 WGUS. The 250 watt translator at 95.5 continued to simulcast WCHZ.

On January 21, 2015, WCHZ-FM dropped the simulcast of WGUS-FM, and began simulcasting WHHD-HD2, and WCHZ 1480 AM, branded as "Hot 95.5/93.1" with a classic hip-hop format. Beasley Media surrendered WCHZ-AM's license to the Federal Communications Commission (FCC) on February 5, 2015; the FCC cancelled the license the same day.

The station's program director is Jay "Baby J" Jones and can be heard weekday afternoons during "Traffic Jammin' with Baby J".

References

External links
Hot 95.5/93.1 website

CHZ-FM
Radio stations established in 1997
Classic hip hop radio stations in the United States
CHZ-FM